Sid Seixeiro (born March 30, 1977) is a Canadian television broadcaster, who has been the cohost of Breakfast Television on the Citytv network since March 2021.

Formerly cohost with Tim Micallef of the radio and television sports talk show Tim and Sid, he was announced on January 21, 2021 as the new cohost of Breakfast Television.

Originally from Mississauga, Ontario, he is an alumnus of the broadcasting program at Humber College. He lives with his wife in Toronto and has no children.

References

1977 births
Canadian television hosts
Canadian television sportscasters
Canadian sports talk radio hosts
Canadian people of Portuguese descent
Humber College alumni
People from Mississauga
Living people